Diosdado Pangan Macapagal Sr.  (September 28, 1910 – April 21, 1997) was a Filipino lawyer, poet and politician who served as the ninth president of the Philippines, serving from 1961 to 1965, and the sixth vice president, serving from 1957 to 1961. He also served as a member of the House of Representatives, and headed the Constitutional Convention of 1970. He was the father of Gloria Macapagal Arroyo, who followed his path as president of the Philippines from 2001 to 2010.

Known as "the poor boy from Lubao," he was a native of Lubao, Pampanga, Macapagal graduated from the University of the Philippines and University of Santo Tomas, both in Manila, after which he worked as a lawyer for the government. He first won the election in 1949 to the House of Representatives, representing the 1st district in his home province of Pampanga. In 1957, he became vice president under the rule of President Carlos P. Garcia, whom he later defeated in the 1961 election.

As president, Macapagal worked to suppress graft and corruption and to stimulate the growth of the Philippine economy. He introduced the country's first land reform law, placed the peso on the free currency exchange market, and liberalized foreign exchange and import controls. Many of his reforms, however, were crippled by a Congress dominated by the rival Nacionalista Party. He is also known for shifting the country's observance of Independence Day from July 4 to June 12, commemorating the day President Emilio Aguinaldo unilaterally declared the independence of the First Philippine Republic from the Spanish Empire in 1898. He stood for re-election in 1965, and was defeated by Ferdinand Marcos.

Under Marcos, Macapagal was elected president of the 1970 constitutional convention that would later draft what became the 1973 Constitution, though the manner in which the charter was ratified and modified led him to later question its legitimacy. He died of heart failure, pneumonia, and renal complications, in 1997, at the age of 86.

Macapagal was also a reputed poet in the Spanish language, though his poetic oeuvre was eclipsed by his political biography.

Early life
Diosdado Macapagal was born on September 28, 1910, in Lubao, Pampanga, the third of five children in a poor family. His father was Urbano Macapagal y Romero (c. 1887 – 1946), a poet who wrote in the local Pampangan language, and his mother was Romana Pangan Macapagal, daughter of Atanacio Miguel Pangan (a former cabeza de barangay of Gutad, Floridablanca, Pampanga) and Lorenza Suing Antiveros. Urbano's mother, Escolástica Romero Macapagal, was a midwife and schoolteacher who taught catechism.

Diosdado is a distant descendant of Don Juan Macapagal, a prince of Tondo, who was a great-grandson of the last reigning lakan of Tondo, Lakan Dula. He is also related to well-to-do Licad family through his mother Romana, who was a second cousin of María Vitug Licad, grandmother of renowned pianist, Cecile Licad. Romana's own grandmother, Genoveva Miguel Pangan, and María's grandmother, Celestina Miguel Macaspac, were sisters. Their mother, María Concepción Lingad Miguel, was the daughter of José Pingul Lingad and Gregoria Malit Bartolo.

Diosdado's family earned extra income by raising pigs and accommodating boarders in their home. Due to his roots in poverty, Macapagal would later become affectionately known as the "Poor Boy from Lubao". Diosdado was also a reputed poet in the Spanish language although his poetic work was eclipsed by his political career.

Early education

Macapagal excelled in his studies at local public schools, graduating valedictorian from Lubao Elementary School, and salutatorian at Pampanga High School. He finished his pre-law course at the University of the Philippines, then enrolled at Philippine Law School in 1932, studying on a scholarship and supporting himself with a part-time job as an accountant. While in law school, he gained prominence as an orator and debater. However, he was forced to quit schooling after two years due to poor health and a lack of money.

Returning to Pampanga, he joined boyhood friend Rogelio de la Rosa in producing and starring in Tagalog operettas patterned after classic Spanish zarzuelas. It was during this period that he married his friend's sister, Purita de la Rosa, in 1938. He had two children with de la Rosa, Cielo and Arturo.

Macapagal raised enough money to continue his studies at the University of Santo Tomas. He also gained the assistance of philanthropist Don Honorio Ventura, the secretary of the interior at the time, who financed his education. He also received financial support from his mother's relatives, notably from the Macaspacs, who owned large tracts of land in barrio Sta. Maria, Lubao, Pampanga. After receiving his Bachelor of Laws degree in 1936, he was admitted to the bar, topping the 1936 bar examination with a score of 89.95%. He later returned to his alma mater to take up graduate studies and earn a Master of Laws degree in 1941, a Doctor of Civil Law degree in 1947, and a PhD in economics in 1957. His dissertation had "Imperatives of Economic Development in the Philippines" as its title.

Early career
After passing the bar examination, Macapagal was invited to join an American law firm as a practicing attorney, a particular honor for a Filipino at the time. He was assigned as a legal assistant to President Manuel L. Quezon in Malacañang Palace. During the Japanese occupation of the Philippines in World War II, Macapagal continued working in Malacañang Palace as an assistant to President José P. Laurel, while secretly aiding the anti-Japanese resistance during the Allied liberation country from the Japanese.

After the war, Macapagal worked as an assistant attorney with one of the largest law firms in the country, Ross, Lawrence, Selph and Carrascoso. With the establishment of the independent Third Republic of the Philippines in 1946, he rejoined government service when President Manuel Roxas appointed him to the Department of Foreign Affairs as the head of its legal division. In 1948, President Elpidio Quirino appointed Macapagal as chief negotiator in the successful transfer of the Turtle Islands in the Sulu Sea from the United Kingdom to the Philippines. That same year, he was assigned as second secretary to the Philippine Embassy in Washington, D.C. In 1949, he was elevated to the position of counselor on legal affairs and treaties, at the time the fourth-highest post in the Philippine Foreign Office.

First marriage
In 1938, Macapagal married Purita de la Rosa. They had two children, Cielo Macapagal-Salgado (who would later become vice governor of Pampanga) and Arturo Macapagal. Purita died in 1943.

Second marriage
On May 5, 1946, Macapagal married Dr. Evangelina Macaraeg, with whom he had two children, Gloria Macapagal Arroyo (who would later become president of the Philippines) and Diosdado Macapagal, Jr.

House of Representatives
On the urging of local political leaders of Pampanga province, President Quirino recalled Macapagal from his position in Washington to run for a seat in the House of Representatives representing the 1st district of Pampanga. The district's incumbent, Representative Amado Yuzon, was a friend of Macapagal, but was opposed by the administration due to his support by communist groups. After a campaign that Macapagal described as cordial and free of personal attacks, he won a landslide victory in the 1949 election. He won re-election in the 1953 election, and served as a representative in the 2nd and 3rd Congress.

At the start of legislative sessions in 1950, the members of the House of Representatives elected Macapagal as chair of the Committee on Foreign Affairs, and he was given several important foreign assignments. He was a Philippine delegate to the United Nations General Assembly multiple times, notably distinguishing himself in debates over communist aggression with Andrei Vishinsky and Jacob Malik of the Soviet Union. He took part in negotiations for the U.S.-R.P. Mutual Defense Treaty, the Laurel–Langley Agreement, and the Japanese Peace Treaty. He also authored the Foreign Service Act, which reorganized and strengthened the Philippine foreign service.

As a representative, Macapagal authored and sponsored several laws of socio-economic importance, particularly aimed at benefiting the rural areas and the poor. Among the pieces of legislation that Macapagal promoted were the Minimum Wage Law, Rural Health Law, Rural Bank Law, the Law on Barrio Councils, the Barrio Industrialization Law, and a law nationalizing the rice and corn industries. He was consistently selected by the Congressional Press Club as one of the Ten Outstanding Congressmen during his tenure. In his second term, he was named Most Outstanding lawmaker of the 3rd Congress .

Vice presidency (1957–1961)
In the May 1957 general elections, the Liberal Party drafted Congressman Macapagal to run for vice president as the running-mate of José Y. Yulo, a former speaker of the House of Representatives. Macapagal's nomination was particularly boosted by Liberal Party president Eugenio Pérez, who insisted that the party's vice presidential nominee have a clean record of integrity and honesty. While Yulo was defeated by Carlos P. Garcia of the Nacionalista Party, Macapagal was elected vice president in an upset victory, defeating the Nacionalista candidate, José B. Laurel, Jr., by over eight percentage points. A month after the election, he was chosen as the president of the Liberal Party.

As the first ever Philippine vice president to be elected from a rival party of the president, Macapagal served out his four-year vice presidential term as a leader of the opposition. The ruling party refused to give him a Cabinet position in the Garcia administration, which was a break from tradition. He was offered a position in the Cabinet only on the condition that he switch allegiance to the ruling Nationalista Party, but he declined the offer and instead played the role of critic to the administration's policies and performance. This allowed him to capitalize on the increasing unpopularity of the Garcia administration. Assigned to performing only ceremonial duties as vice president, he spent his time making frequent trips to the countryside to acquaint himself with voters and to promote the image of the Liberal Party.

As president, Macapagal worked to suppress graft and corruption and to stimulate the Philippine economy.

Presidency (1961–1965)

In the 1961 presidential election, Macapagal ran against Garcia's re-election bid, promising an end to corruption and appealing to the electorate as a common man from humble beginnings. He defeated the incumbent president with a 55% to 45% margin. His inauguration as the president of the Philippines took place on December 30, 1961.

Administration and cabinet

Major legislation signed
 Republic Act No. 3512 – An Act Creating A Fisheries Commission Defining Its Powers, Duties and Functions, and Appropriating Funds Therefore.
 Republic Act No. 3518 – An Act Creating The Philippine Veterans' Bank, and For Other Purposes.
 Republic Act No. 3844 – An Act To Ordain The Agricultural Land Reform Code and To Institute Land Reforms In The Philippines, Including The Abolition of Tenancy and The Channeling of Capital Into Industry, Provide For The Necessary Implementing Agencies, Appropriate Funds Therefor and For Other Purposes.
 Republic Act No. 4166 – An Act Changing The Date Of Philippine Independence Day From July Four To June Twelve, And Declaring July Four As Philippine Republic Day, Further Amending For The Purpose Section Twenty-Nine Of The Revised Administrative Code.
 Republic Act No. 4180 – An Act Amending Republic Act Numbered Six Hundred Two, Otherwise Known As The Minimum Wage Law, By Raising The Minimum Wage For Certain Workers, And For Other Purposes.

Domestic policies

Economy
In his inaugural address, Macapagal promised a socio-economic program anchored on "a return to free and private enterprise", placing economic development in the hands of private entrepreneurs with minimal interference.

Twenty days after the inauguration, exchange controls were lifted and the Philippine peso was allowed to float on the free currency exchange market. The currency controls were initially adopted by the administration of Elpidio Quirino as a temporary measure, but continued to be adopted by succeeding administrations. The peso devalued from P2.64 to the U.S. dollar, and stabilized at P3.80 to the dollar, supported by a $300 million stabilization fund from the International Monetary Fund.

To achieve the national goal of economic and social progress with prosperity reaching down to the masses, there existed a choice of methods. First, there was the choice between the democratic and dictatorial systems, the latter prevailing in communist countries. On this, the choice was easy as Filipinos had long been committed to the democratic method. With the democratic mechanism, however, the next choice was between free enterprise and the continuing of the controls system. Macapagal stated the essence of free enterprise in layman parlance in declaring before Congress on January 22, 1962, that "the task of economic development belongs principally to private enterprise and not to the government.

Before independence there was free enterprise in the Philippines under Presidents Manuel Quezon, Sergio Osmeña and Manuel Roxas. In 1950 President Elpidio Quirino deviated from free enterprise launching as a temporary emergency measure the system of exchange and import controls. The controls system was carried on by President Magsaysay and Garcia.

The first fundamental decision Macapagal had to make was whether to continue the system of exchange controls of Quirino, Magsaysay and Garcia or to return to the free enterprise of Quezon, Osmena and Roxas. It had been his view since he was a congressman for eight years that the suitable economic system for Filipinos was free enterprise. So on January 21, 1962, after working for 20 straight hours he signed a Central Bank decree abolishing exchange controls and returning the country to free enterprise.

During the 20 days available to make a decision on choice between controls and free enterprise, between his inauguration as president and before the opening of Congress, Macapagal's main adviser was Andres Castillo, governor of the Central Bank.

Further reform efforts by Macapagal were blocked by the Nacionalistas, who dominated the House of Representatives and the Senate at that time. Nonetheless, Macapagal was able to achieve steady economic progress, and annual GDP growth averaged at 5.53% for 1962–65.

Socio-economic program
 
The removal of controls and the restoration of free enterprise was intended to provide only the fundamental setting in which Macapagal could work out economic and social progress. A specific and periodic program for the guidance of both the private sector and the government was an essential instrument to attain the economic and social development that constituted the goal of his labors.

Such a program for his administration was formulated under his authority and direction by a group of able and reputable economic and business leaders the most active and effective of which was Sixto Roxas III. From an examination of the planned targets and requirements of the Five-Year program – formally known as the Five-Year Socio-Economic Integrated Development Program – it could be seen that it aimed at the following objectives.

 immediate restoration of economic stability;
 alleviating the plight of the common man; and
 establishing a dynamic basic for future growth.

Free enterprise was restored with decontrol. The Five-Year Economic Program had been prescribed. Land reform abolishing tenancy had been launched. These were essential foundations for economic and social progress for the greatest number.

The essential foundations having been laid, attention must then be turned to the equally difficult task of building the main edifice by implementing the economic program. Although the success of Macapagal's Socio-Economic Program in free enterprise inherently depended on the private sector, it would be helpful and necessary for the government to render active assistance in its implementation by the citizens.

Such role of the government in free enterprise, in the view of Macapagal, required it (1) to provide the social overhead like roads, airfields and ports that directly or proximately promote economic growth, (2) to adopt fiscal and monetary policies salutary to investments, and most importantly (3) to serve as an entrepreneur or promote of basic and key private industries, particularly those that require capital too large for businessmen to put up by themselves. Among the enterprises he selected for active government promotion were integrated steel, fertilizer, pulp, meat canning and tourism.

Land reform

Like Ramon Magsaysay, President Diosdado Macapagal came from the masses. He savored calling himself the "Poor boy from Lubao". Ironically, he had little popularity among the masses. This could be attributed to an absence any charismatic appeal owing to his stiff personality. But despite this, Macapagal had certain achievements. Foremost of these was the Agricultural Land Reform Code of 1963 (Republic Act No. 3844) which provided for the purchase of private farmlands with the intention of distributing them in small lots to the landless tenants on easy term of payment. It is a major development in history of land reform in the Philippines,

In comparison with the previous agrarian legislation, the law lowered the retention limit to 75 hectares, whether owned by individuals or corporations. It removed the term "contiguous" and established the leasehold system. The share-tenancy or the kasama system was prohibited. It formulated a bill of rights that assured agricultural workers the right to self-organization and to a minimum wage. It also created an office that acquired and distributed farmlands and a financing institution for this purpose. The major flaw of this law was, however, that it had several exemptions, such as ort (big capital plantations established during the Spanish and American periods); fishponds, saltbeds, and lands primarily planted to citrus, coconuts, cacao, coffee, durian, and other similar permanent trees; landholdings converted to residential, commercial, industrial, or other similar non-agricultural purposes.

It was viewed that the 75-hectare retention limit was just too high for the growing population density. Moreover, this law merely allowed the transfer of the landlordism from one area to another. This was because landlords were paid in bonds, which he could use to purchase agricultural lands. Likewise, the farmer was free to choose to be excluded from the leasehold arrangements if he volunteered to give up the landholdings to the landlord.

Within two years after the law was implemented, no land was being purchased under its term and conditions caused by the peasants' inability to purchase the land. Besides, the government seemed lacking of strong political will, as shown by the Congress' allotment of only one million Philippine pesos for the implementation of this code. At least Php 200 million was needed within a year from the enactment and implementation of the code, and Php 300 million in the next three years for the program to be successful. However, by 1972, the code had benefited only 4,500 peasants covering 68 estates, at the cost of Php 57 million to the government. Consequently, by the 1970s, the farmers ended up tilling less land, with their share in the farm also being less. They incurred more debts, depending on the landlord, creditors, and palay buyers. Indeed, during the administration of Macapagal, the productivity of the farmers further declined.

Anti-corruption drive
One of Macapagal's major campaign pledges had been to clean out the government corruption that had proliferated under former President Garcia. The administration also openly feuded with Filipino businessmen Fernando Lopez and Eugenio Lopez, brothers who had controlling interests in several large businesses. The administration alluded to the brothers as "Filipino Stonehills who build and maintain business empires through political power, including the corruption of politicians and other officials". In the 1965 election, the Lopezes threw their support behind Macapagal's rival, Ferdinand Marcos, with Fernando Lopez serving Marcos' running mate.

Stonehill controversy

The Administration's campaign against corruption was tested by Harry Stonehill, an American expatriate with a $50-million business empire in the Philippines. Macapagal's secretary of justice, Jose W. Diokno investigated Stonehill on charges of tax evasion, smuggling, misdeclaration of imports, and corruption of public officials. Diokno's investigation revealed Stonehill's ties to corruption within the government. Macapagal, however, prevented Diokno from prosecuting Stonehill by deporting the American instead, then dismissing Diokno from the cabinet. Diokno questioned Macapagal's actions, saying, "How can the government now prosecute the corrupted when it has allowed the corrupter to go?" Diokno later served as a senator.

Independence Day
Macapagal appealed to nationalist sentiments by shifting the commemoration of Philippine independence day. On May 12, 1962, he signed a proclamation which declared Tuesday, June 12, 1962, as a special public holiday in commemoration of the declaration of independence from Spain on that date in 1898. The change became permanent in 1964 with the signing of Republic Act No. 4166. For having issued his 1962 proclamation, Macapagal is generally credited with having moved the celebration date of the Independence Day holiday. Years later, Macapagal told journalist Stanley Karnow the real reason for the change: "When I was in the diplomatic corps, I noticed that nobody came to our receptions on the Fourth of July, but went to the American Embassy instead. So, to compete, I decided we needed a different holiday."

Foreign policies

North Borneo claim

On September 12, 1962, during President Diosdado Macapagal's administration, the territory of eastern North Borneo (now Sabah), and the full sovereignty, title and dominion over the territory were ceded by heirs of the Sultanate of Sulu, Sultan Muhammad Esmail E. Kiram I, to the Republic of the Philippines. The cession effectively gave the Philippine government the full authority to pursue their claim in international courts. The Philippines broke diplomatic relations with Malaysia after the federation had included Sabah in 1963. It was revoked in 1989 because succeeding Philippine administrations have placed the claim in the back burner in the interest of pursuing cordial economic and security relations with Kuala Lumpur. To date, Malaysia continues to consistently reject Philippine calls to resolve the matter of Sabah's jurisdiction to the International Court of Justice. Sabah sees the claim made by the Philippines' Moro leader Nur Misuari to take Sabah to International Court of Justice (ICJ) as a non-issue and thus dismissed the claim.

MAPHILINDO

In July 1963, President Diosdado Macapagal convened a summit meeting in Manila in which a nonpolitical confederation for Malaysia, the Philippines, and Indonesia, Maphilindo, was proposed as a realization of José Rizal's dream of bringing together the Malay peoples, seen as artificially divided by colonial frontiers.

Maphilindo was described as a regional association that would approach issues of common concern in the spirit of consensus. However, it was also perceived as a tactic on the parts of Jakarta and Manila to delay, or even prevent, the formation of the Federation of Malaysia. Manila had its own claim to Sabah (formerly British North Borneo), and Jakarta protested the formation of Malaysia as a British imperialist plot. The plan failed when Sukarno adopted his plan of "konfrontasi" with Malaysia. The Konfrontasi, or Confrontation basically aimed at preventing Malaysia from attaining independence. The idea was inspired onto President Sukarno by the Partai Komunis Indonesia (PKI), or literally the Indonesian Communist Party. The party convinced President Sukarno that the formation of Malaysia is a form of neo-colonization and would affect tranquility in Indonesia. The subsequent development of ASEAN almost certainly excludes any possibility of the project ever being revived.

Vietnam War

Before the end of his term in 1965, President Diosdado Macapagal persuaded Congress to send troops to South Vietnam. However this proposal was blocked by the opposition led by Senate President Ferdinand Marcos who deserted Macapagal's Liberal Party and defected to the Nacionalista Party.

The U.S. government's active interest in bringing other nations into the war had been part of U.S. policy discussions as early as 1961. President Lyndon Johnson first publicly appealed for other countries to come to the aid of South Vietnam on April 23, 1964–in what was called the "More Flags" program. Chester Cooper, former director of Asian affairs for the White House, explained why the impetus came from the United States instead of from the Republic of South Vietnam: "The 'More Flags' campaign ... required the application of considerable pressure for Washington to elicit any meaningful commitments. One of the more exasperating aspects of the search…was the lassitude …... of the Saigon government. In part ... the South Vietnam leaders were preoccupied with political jockeying. ... In addition, Saigon appeared to believe that the program was a public relations campaign directed at the American people."

1963 midterm election

The senatorial election was held on November 12, 1963. Macapagal's Liberal Party (LP) won four out of the eight seats up for grabs during the election – thereby increasing the LP's senate seats from eight to ten.

1965 presidential campaign

Towards the end of his term, Macapagal decided to seek re-election to continue seeking reforms which he claimed were stifled by a "dominant and uncooperative opposition" in Congress. With Senate President Ferdinand Marcos, a fellow member of the Liberal Party, unable to win his party's nomination due to Macapagal's re-election bid, Marcos switched allegiance to the rival Nacionalista Party to oppose Macapagal.

Among the issues raised against the incumbent administration were graft and corruption, rise in consumer goods, and persisting peace and order issues. Macapagal was defeated by Marcos in the November 1965 polls.

Post-presidency and death

Macapagal announced his retirement from politics following his 1965 loss to Marcos. In 1971, he was elected president of the constitutional convention that drafted what became the 1973 Constitution. The manner in which the charter was ratified and later modified led him to later question its legitimacy. In 1979, he formed the National Union for Liberation as a political party to oppose the Marcos regime.

Following the restoration of democracy in 1986, Macapagal took on the role of elder statesman, and was a member of the Philippine Council of State. He also served as honorary chairman of the National Centennial Commission, and chairman of the board of CAP Life, among others.

In his retirement, Macapagal devoted much of his time to reading and writing. He published his presidential memoir, authored several books about government and economics, and wrote a weekly column for the Manila Bulletin newspaper.

Diosdado Macapagal died of heart failure, pneumonia and renal complications at the Makati Medical Center on April 21, 1997. He was accorded a state funeral and was interred at the Libingan ng mga Bayani on April 27, 1997.

Legacy

On September 28, 2009, Macapagal's daughter, President Gloria Macapagal Arroyo, inaugurated the President Diosdado Macapagal Museum and Library, located at his home town of Lubao, Pampanga.

President Benigno S. Aquino III declared September 28, 2010, as a special non-working holiday in Macapagal's home province of Pampanga to commemorate the centennial of his birth.

Museum and library
These house the personal books and memorabilia of Macapagal.

Electoral history
Vice presidential election, 1957:
 Diosdado Macapagal (Liberal Party) – 2,189,197 (46.55%)
 José Laurel Jr. (Nacionalista Party) – 1,783,012 (37.91%)
 Vicente Araneta (Progressive Party) – 375,090 (7.97%)
 Lorenzo Tañada (Nationalist Citizens' Party) – 344,685 (7.32%)
 Restituto Fresto (Lapiang Malaya) – 10,494 (0.22%)

Presidential election, 1961:
 Diosdado Macapagal (Liberal Party) – 3,554,840 (55%)
 Carlos P. Garcia (Nacionalista Party) – 2,902,996 (45%)

Presidential election, 1965:
 Ferdinand Marcos (Nacionalista Party) – 3,861,324 (51.94%)
 Diosdado Macapagal (Liberal Party) – 3,187,752 (42.88%)
 Raul Manglapus (Progressive Party) – 384,564 (5.17%)

Honors

National honours
 :
 : Grand Cross of the Gawad Mabini (GCrM) – (1994)
 : Knight Grand Cross of the Order of the Knights of Rizal (KGCR).

Foreign honours
:
 Grand Cordon of the Order of Brilliant Jade (May 2, 1960)
:
 Grand Cordon of the Supreme Order of the Chrysanthemum (1962)
 Spain:
 Knight of the Collar of the Order of Isabella the Catholic (June 30, 1962) 
:
 Knight Grand Cross with Collar of the Order of Merit of the Italian Republic (July 1962) 
:
 Knight with Collar of the Order of Pius IX (July 9, 1962)
:
 Recipient of the Nishan-e-Pakistan (July 11, 1962)
:
 Collar of the Order pro merito Melitensi
:
 Knight of the Order of the Rajamitrabhorn (July 9, 1963)
:
 Grand Cross Special Class of the Order of Merit of the Federal Republic of Germany (November 1963)

Publications

 Speeches of President Diosdado Macapagal. Manila: Bureau of Printing, 1961.
 New Hope for the Common Man: Speeches and Statements of President Diosdado Macapagal. Manila: Malacañang Press Office, 1962.
 Five Year Integrated Socio-economic Program for the Philippines. Manila: [s.n.], 1963.
 Fullness of Freedom: Speeches and Statements of President Diosdado Macapagal. Manila: Bureau of Printing, 1965.
 An Asian looks at South America. Quezon City: Mac Publishing House, 1966.
 The Philippines Turns East. Quezon City: Mac Publishing House, 1966.
 A Stone for the Edifice: Memoirs of a President. Quezon City: Mac Publishing House, 1968.
 A New Constitution for the Philippines. Quezon City: Mac Publishing House, 1970.
 Democracy in the Philippines. Manila: [s.n.], 1976.
 Constitutional Democracy in the World. Manila: Santo Tomas University Press, 1993.
 From Nipa Hut to Presidential Palace: Autobiography of President Diosdado P. Macapagal. Quezon City: Philippine Academy for Continuing Education and Research, 2002.

See also
 History of the Philippines (1946–1965)
 History of the Philippines
 Gloria Macapagal Arroyo
 Agricultural Land Reform Code
 MAPHILINDO

Named after Diosdado Macapagal:
 Diosdado Macapagal Boulevard
 Macapagal Bridge

References

External links

 Macapagal.com – Diosdado Macapagal
 Office of the President of the Philippines
 Office of the Vice President of the Philippines
 House of Representatives of the Philippines

|-

|-

|-

|-

|-

 
1910 births
1997 deaths
Deaths from pneumonia in the Philippines
Deaths from kidney failure
Filipino anti-communists
20th-century Filipino economists
Filipino Roman Catholics
Kapampangan people
Diosdado
Members of the House of Representatives of the Philippines from Pampanga
Paramilitary Filipinos
People from Pampanga
Candidates in the 1961 Philippine presidential election
Candidates in the 1965 Philippine presidential election
Presidents of the Philippines
University of Santo Tomas alumni
University of the Philippines alumni
Vice presidents of the Philippines
Liberal Party (Philippines) politicians
Recipients of Gawad Mabini
20th-century Filipino lawyers
Burials at the Libingan ng mga Bayani
Garcia administration cabinet members
Candidates in the 1957 Philippine vice-presidential election
Philippine Law School alumni
Grand Crosses Special Class of the Order of Merit of the Federal Republic of Germany
Recipients of the Order pro Merito Melitensi
Presidents of the Liberal Party of the Philippines